Green Lane may refer to:

Green lane (road), a type of route
Green Lane (Stockport), a defunct football ground in Stockport, England
Green Lane, George Town, Penang, Malaysia
Green Lane, London, United Kingdom
Green Lane, Pennsylvania, United States
Greenlane, Auckland, New Zealand
Green Lane, Singapore
 Green Lane Bridge in Philadelphia

See also
Green Lane Hospital, a psychiatric hospital in Devizes, England
Green Lane railway station, Wirral, England
Green Lane Masjid, a large mosque in Birmingham, England
Harringay, a neighbourhood in the London borough of Haringey sometimes incorrectly referred to as Green Lanes or Harringay Green Lanes because of the railway station
Green Lanes (disambiguation)